A phaeton is a style of open automobile without any fixed weather protection, which was popular from the 1900s until the 1930s. It is an automotive equivalent of the horse-drawn fast, lightweight phaeton carriage. 

A popular style in the US from the mid–1920s and continuing into the first half of the 1930s was the dual cowl phaeton, with a cowl separating the rear passengers from the driver and front passenger.

Phaetons fell from favour when closed cars and convertible body styles became widely available during the 1930s. Eventually, the term "phaeton" became so widely and loosely applied that almost any vehicle with two axles and a row or rows of seats across the body could be called a phaeton. Convertibles and pillarless hardtops were sometimes marketed as "phaetons" after actual phaetons were phased out.

History

The term phaeton had historically described a light, open four-wheeled carriage. When automobiles arrived it was applied to a light two-seater with minimal coachwork. The term was interchangeable with spyder, derived from a light form of phaeton carriage known as a spider. Originally meant to denote a faster and lighter vehicle than a touring car, the two terms eventually became interchangeable.

A detachable folding or rigid roof could be added before a drive in preparation for inclement weather, and side curtains or screens could be installed once the roof was in place. This was mainly temporary and partial relief rather than the more permanent, watertight protection offered by a convertible. As a result, a phaeton was much lighter than the sturdier, weather-ready convertible. Since the body was entirely open, it was easy to add or remove an extra row of seating where space had been left in the original construction.

A phaeton differs from a convertible in having no winding or sliding windows in the doors or the body.

Doubles and triples
There were also double phaetons, with two rows of seats, triple phaetons, and closed phaetons.

After 1912, American use of the term began to be most closely associated with the "triple phaeton" body configurations that had room for three rows of seats, whether all three were installed or not. This also led to the term "phaeton" becoming similar to, and eventually interchangeable with, the term "touring car".

Specific use of the term phaeton is with the dual cowl phaeton, a body style in which the rear passengers were separated from the driver and the front passengers by a cowl or bulkhead, often with its own folding windshield.

Decline in popularity

The phaeton and the touring car were popular up to the 1930s, after which they were largely replaced by the convertible, which also had a retractable roof, but also included side windows so that the car could be completely enclosed.

The Willys-Overland Jeepster was the last true phaeton produced by a major US automaker, and was introduced ten years after the previous phaeton to be offered by an American manufacturer. The post-World War II demand for automobiles - of any description - was an opportunity for Willys-Overland to build on the Jeep's military recognition and they evolved the 1946 Jeepster two-door station wagon to the 1948 phaeton. It provided a "Spartan but adequate appointments" that included  hinged front door vent windows and plastic side curtains rather than roll-up glass windows. Marketed from 1948 to 1951, the Jeepster phaeton was a rather expensive niche vehicle and "though admired by many, it was purchased by relatively few."

In 1952, a year after Willys last offered the Jeepster, Chrysler Corporation built three Imperial Parade phaetons for ceremonial use, one by New York City, one by Los Angeles, and one intended for the White House, but ultimately used for events throughout the United States. These were dual-cowl phaetons custom-built on stretched versions of the company’s Imperial Crown Limousine chassis.

As a model name
In the late 1930s, Buick included a "convertible phaeton" body style, which was actually a four-door convertible, as the doors had roll up windows in them and the car could be fully closed.

During the 1956 model year, Mercury marketed the four-door hardtop versions of its Montclair and Monterey models as "phaetons."

In 2004, Volkswagen introduced a vehicle with the name Phaeton, which has a typical four-door sedan body style.

See also
 Coupé
 Grand tourer
 Roadster
 Runabout

References

Car body styles